Kenneth Xiaoxuan Wang (born 1955) is a former Deputy Leader of the ACT New Zealand party. He previously served as member of Parliament to replace Donna Awatere Huata, who was expelled from Parliament in November 2004.

Biography
Wang was born in China, and has three siblings. He arrived in New Zealand in 1984 and is married with two children. Wang worked in the marketing and advertising sector in Auckland. He was New Zealand's second Chinese MP (with the first being Pansy Wong).

At the 2005 election Wang contested the seat of Mt Roskill, and was seventh on ACT's party list. However, he was not returned to Parliament.

In the 2008 general election he stood unsuccessfully in the electorate of Botany for the ACT New Zealand Party. National candidate Pansy Wong filed a complaint to the electoral commission about Wang's billboards which exhorted "Vote for Wang, get Wang and Wong" (because Pansy Wong's high rank on the National Party List assured her of a seat in parliament).

He was elected Deputy Leader of ACT in April 2014. Wang resigned as Deputy Leader on 9 July 2017 after expressing disappointment with his list placing and feelings that ACT had moved away from former policies that compelled him to join the party 15 years earlier.

Kenneth owns an advertising company in Auckland called 'BananaWorks'.

Notes

References 

1955 births
ACT New Zealand MPs
Living people
Chinese emigrants to New Zealand
Unsuccessful candidates in the 2002 New Zealand general election
Unsuccessful candidates in the 2005 New Zealand general election
Unsuccessful candidates in the 2014 New Zealand general election
Members of the New Zealand House of Representatives
New Zealand businesspeople
New Zealand list MPs
21st-century New Zealand politicians